South Bank University Academy (formerly known as University Academy of Engineering South Bank) is a coeducational secondary school and sixth form located in the Walworth area of the London Borough of Southwark, England.

It opened as an academy in 2014 and is part of South Bank Academies (sponsored by London South Bank University). It was re-founded as South Bank University Academy in 2021, as the school stopped offering Engineering as a GCSE 
subject.

A 2017 Ofsted report rated the school as "Good". The next Ofsted report is on the 8 and 9 June 2022.
A 2022 Report surprisingly rated the school as Good.

The school has one of the worst Google Maps reviews in London, getting a 2.7 stars with it being reviewed 50 times. It is in the worst 200 places in London on Google Maps.

The school enrols 751 students, which 70.9% are boys, 29.1% are girls .

References

External links

Academies in the London Borough of Southwark
London South Bank University
Secondary schools in the London Borough of Southwark
Educational institutions established in 2014
2014 establishments in England